Nathan Polak (born September 5, 1989) is an American soccer player.

Career
Born in Lincoln, Nebraska, Polak played college soccer at Drake University in 2008 and then transferred to Hastings College between 2009 and 2011.

Polak had a much decorated career for the Broncos as he was a two-time first team all-league selection and the 2011 GPAC Offensive Player-of-the-Year. He went on to be selected as a First Team NAIA All-American in 2011. Twice in 2011 he was named NAIA National Player-of-the-Week.

In is junior year Hastings won the NAIA National Championship, while as a senior they were the NAIA National Runner-Up. He was named to the NAIA All-Tournament Team in both seasons (2010 and 2011).

On January 17, 2012 Polak was selected in the fourth round (no. 69 overall) of the 2012 MLS Supplemental Draft by New York Red Bulls. However, he wasn't signed by the club.

Polak signed his first professional contract with NASL club Minnesota Stars FC on August 15, 2012. He scored his first professional goal for the Stars less than one month later, on September 11, 2012, against the Puerto Rico Islanders in his first ever starting appearance.

Personal
Nate is brother of Tyler Polak, who also plays for Greenville Triumph SC.

References

External links
 Drake profile

1989 births
Living people
American soccer players
Drake Bulldogs men's soccer players
Minnesota United FC (2010–2016) players
OKC Energy FC players
Louisville City FC players
American people of Czech descent
Association football midfielders
Soccer players from Nebraska
Sportspeople from Lincoln, Nebraska
New York Red Bulls draft picks
North American Soccer League players
USL Championship players